St. Michael and All Angels is the parish church for the town of Middlewich in Cheshire, England. It stands at the junction of the A54 and A533 roads.  The church is recorded in the National Heritage List for England as a designated Grade II* listed building.  It is an active Anglican parish church in the diocese of Chester, the archdeaconry of Chester and the deanery of Middlewich.  Its benefice is combined with that of St John, Byley.  In 1947 the architectural historian Raymond Richards described the church as "the one building, in a depressing town, which is mellow and dignified".

History
Parts of the church date from the 12th century, possibly the lower portion of the tower, but more likely the narrow arcade of the east bay.  Most of the church was built during the period between about 1480 and 1520 when the nave clerestory was added, new windows were inserted, the Lady chapel was built at the east end of the south aisle and a two-storey porch was added to the south side.  In the following century the Kinderton chapel was added at the east end of the north aisle.  The church was damaged during the Civil War, particularly during the First Battle of Middlewich in March 1643, when the Royalists used it as a place of sanctuary.  In 1801 restorations were carried out, including moving the Venables screen into the tower. In 1857 a window was added to the memory of John Hulse.  In 1857–60 the north aisle and Kinderton chapel were remodelled by Joseph Clarke.  This was a part of a general remodelling of the church, which included removing the whitewash from the interior of the church to reveal the sandstone appearance seen today.

Architecture

Exterior
The church is built of sandstone and is mainly Perpendicular in style. The plan of the church consists of a tower at the northwest, a four-bay nave with a clerestory, broad north and south aisles, a two-bay chancel and a south porch.  At the east end of the north aisle is the Kinderton chapel, built in the 16th century, and at the east end of the south aisle is a chapel which was formerly a Lady chapel.

Interior
The timber roof of the chancel was originally  built by Sir William Brereton in 1621.  This was replaced in 1951 with a design copying the original.  The Kinderton Chapel (also known as the Bostock Chapel) is now used as the rector's vestry, and it contains the oldest monument in the church, a brass dated 1591 in memory of Elizabeth Venables, wife of Baron Kinderton.  A Jacobean screen with the carved arms of the Venables family was originally at the entrance to the Kinderton chapel but is now inside the tower.  The organ was built in 1908 by Conacher and radically rebuilt in 1964 by Rushworth and Dreaper.  There is a ring of eight bells.  Three of these were cast in 1711 by Rudhall of Gloucester, one bell was cast in 1841 by Thomas Mears II at the Whitechapel Bell Foundry, and the other four are dated 1897 by John Taylor and Company. The parish registers begin in 1604 and the churchwardens' accounts in 1636.

External features
In the churchyard is a sundial probably dating from the late 18th century.  It consists of a vase baluster on a circular stone step on brick base. The copper dial has a date which is illegible and the gnomon is broken.  It is designated as a Grade II listed building.

Priests and Vicars of Middlewich

*denotes joint ministers

Gallery

See also

Grade II* listed buildings in Cheshire East
Listed buildings in Middlewich

References

External links

Photographs by Craig Thornber

Church of England church buildings in Cheshire
Grade II* listed churches in Cheshire
English churches with Norman architecture
English Gothic architecture in Cheshire
Middlewich
Diocese of Chester